Fortune Express is a 1991 French drama film directed by Olivier Schatzky. It was entered into the 41st Berlin International Film Festival.

Cast
 Thierry Frémont as Gadouille
 Cris Campion as Pascal Perkiss
 Hervé Laudière as Marko
 Luc Bernard as Chiffre N°1
 Christian Bouillette as Bobo
 Valeria Bruni Tedeschi as Corinne
 Richard Bean as L'optimiste
 Thierry Ravel as Bichon
 Arno Chevrier as Chiffre N°4
 Hervé Langlois as Chiffre N°5
 Vincent de Bouard as Chiffre barman
 Jean O'Cottrell as Le directeur de la banque
 Isabelle Petit-Jacques as L'employée de la banque
 Pascal De Toffoli as L'extatique

References

External links

1991 films
1990s French-language films
1991 drama films
Films directed by Olivier Schatzky
French drama films
1990s French films